The 1989 European Competition for Women's Football took place in West Germany. It was won by the hosts in a final against defending champions Norway. Again, the competition began with four qualifying groups, but this time the top two countries qualified for a home-and-away quarter final, before the four winners entered the semi-finals in the host nation.

Qualification

Squads
For a list of all squads that played in the final tournament, see 1989 European Competition for Women's Football squads

Bracket

Semifinals

Third place playoff

Final

Awards

Goalscorers
2 goals
  Sissel Grude
  Ursula Lohn

1 goal

  Angelika Fehrmann
  Heidi Mohr
  Silvia Neid
  Feriana Ferraguzzi
  Elisabetta Vignotto
  Linda Medalen
  Helen Johansson
  Pia Sundhage
  Lena Videkull

References

External links
Results at UEFA.com

Women
1989
1989
European Competition for Women's Football
1988–89 in Italian football
European Competition for Women's Football
European Competition for Women's Football
European Competition for Women's Football
European Competition for Women's Football
1988–89 in West German women's football